Vladimir Grigorievich Nak (5 November 1935, Tyumen – 16 February 2010, Moscow) was a Russian transport engineer, honorary builder of the RSFSR, and Head of the Production construction and installation union Yamaltransstroy.

Under his direct leadership and participation, construction of a large number of transportation, industrial, residential and socio-cultural facilities was implemented throughout the European part of the USSR

Biography
Born on 5 November 1935 in the city of Moscow.
In 1959, he graduated from the Moscow Institute of Transport Engineers. His career path began in the system of the Ministry for Transport Construction of the Soviet of Socialist Republics, a path leading from foreman to Deputy Head of the Main Department for Railway Construction of the North and West.

From 1986: headed the newly established production construction and installation union (PSMO) Yamaltransstroy. From 1992: general director of the joint stock company Yamaltransstroy, which became the successor of the PSMO. 525 km of the 572-kilometre long Obskaya-Bovanenkovo railway was built under his leadership and personal participation.

In 1997, he was elected chairman of the Board of Directors of Yamaltransstroy JSC. Repeatedly elected deputy of Tyumen Oblast and Yamalo-Nenetsky Okrug Council of People's Deputies.

Death
Died on 16 February 2010 in Moscow.

Awards and marks of recognition

Awards
Order of the Badge of Honour
Order of Peoples' Friendship

Titles and recognition
Honorary builder of the RSFSR
Honorary transport engineer 
Honorary worker of the gas industry
Honorary resident of Yamalo-Nenetsky Autonomous Okrug

Family
Wife — Irina Alexandrovna Kuznetsova 
Son — Igor Nak

References

Links
Life path of Vladimir Nak
Vladimir Nak. Epilogue to Confession

1935 births
2010 deaths
Russian engineers